Outlaws of the Prairie is a 1937 American Western film directed by Sam Nelson, starring Charles Starrett, Donald Grayson, and Iris Meredith.

Cast
 Charles Starrett as Dart Collins
 Donald Grayson as Slim Grayson
 Iris Meredith as Judy Garfield
 Norman Willis as William Lupton
 Dick Curtis as Dragg
 Edward LeSaint as Lafe Garfield
 Edmund Cobb as Jed Stevens
 Art Mix as Lawton
 Steve Clark as Cobb
 Hank Bell as Jim
 Earle Hodgins as Neepah
 Lee Shumway as Capt. MacMillian
 Sons of the Pioneers

References

1937 films
1937 Western (genre) films
Columbia Pictures films
Films directed by Sam Nelson
American black-and-white films
American Western (genre) films
1930s English-language films
1930s American films